Laura Irene Brander-Wallin (née Brander; 5 April 1909 – 1 January 1994) was a Finnish seamstress and politician, born in Pori. She was a member of the Parliament of Finland from 1948 to 1958 and again for a short time in 1962. She was at first a member of the Social Democratic Party of Finland (SDP) and later of the Social Democratic Union of Workers and Smallholders (TPSL).

References

1909 births
1994 deaths
People from Pori
People from Turku and Pori Province (Grand Duchy of Finland)
Social Democratic Party of Finland politicians
Social Democratic Union of Workers and Smallholders politicians
Members of the Parliament of Finland (1948–51)
Members of the Parliament of Finland (1951–54)
Members of the Parliament of Finland (1954–58)
Members of the Parliament of Finland (1958–62)
20th-century Finnish women politicians
Women members of the Parliament of Finland